Andrei Severny may refer to:
 Andrei Severny (astronomer)
 Andrei Severny (filmmaker)